Bolivia competed at the 1984 Summer Olympics in Los Angeles, United States.  The nation returned to the Summer Games after participating in the American-led boycott of the 1980 Summer Olympics. Eleven competitors, ten men and one woman, took part in eleven events in six sports.

Athletics

Men's Marathon
 Juan Camacho
 Final — 2:21:04 (→ 38th place)

Men's 20 km Walk
 Oswaldo Morejón
 Final — 1:44:42 (→ 36th place)

Men's 50 km Walk
 Osvaldo Morejón
 Final — DNF (→ no ranking)

Women's Marathon 
 Nelly Chávez 
 Final — 2:51:35 (→ 42nd place)

Boxing

Men's Flyweight (– 51 kg)
 René Centellas
 First Round — Lost to Jeff Fenech (AUS), RSC-3

Men's Heavyweight (– 91 kg)
 Marvin Perez
 First Round — Bye
 Second Round — Scheduled to fight Henry Tillman (USA), but sustained a broken hand beforehand and withdrew.

Fencing

One male fencer represented Bolivia in 1984.

Men's foil
 Saúl Mendoza

Men's épée
 Saúl Mendoza

Judo

Men's Competition
 Edgar Claure

Shooting

Men's Competition
 Javier Asbun
 Víctor Hugo Campos
 Luis Gamarra
 Mauricio Kattan

Wrestling

Men's Competition
 Leonardo Camacho

References

External links
Official Olympic Reports

Nations at the 1984 Summer Olympics
1984
Summer Olympics